Many named hiking trails have been established in Hong Kong:

Hong Kong Island 

 Hong Kong Trail
 Wilson Trail (stages 1 and 2)
 Tai Tam Country Trail
 Pottinger Peak Country Trail
 Hong Pak Country Trail
 Aberdeen Tree Walk
 Tai Tam Tree Walk
 Pok Fu Lam Tree Walk
 Quarry Bay Tree Walk
 Wong Nai Chung Tree Walk
 Lung Fu Shan Fitness Trail
 Aberdeen Fitness Trail
 Quarry Bay Jogging Trail
 Aberdeen Orienteering Trail
 Quarry Bay Orienteering Trail
 Pok Fu Lam Orienteering Trail
 Pok Fu Lam Family Walk
 Tai Tam Family Walk
 Aberdeen Nature Trail
 Central and Western Heritage Trail
 Tai Tam Waterworks Heritage Trail
 Wan Chai Heritage Trail
 St. Stephen's College Heritage Trail
 Morning Trail
 Pik Shan Path

Lantau Island 

 Lantau Trail
 South Lantau Country Trail
 Wong Lung Hang Country Trail
 Keung Shan Country Trail
 Chi Ma Wan Country Trail
 Shek Pik Country Trail
 Fan Lau Country Trail
 Tei Tong Tsai Country Trail
 Lo Fu Tau Country Trail
 Nei Nak Shan Country Trail
 Luk Wu Country Trail
 Ngong Ping Tree Walk
 Nam Shan Tree Walk

Other Islands 
 Ping Chau Country Trail

Kowloon & New Territories 

 MacLehose Trail
 Wilson Trail (stages 3 through 10)
 Hok Tau Country Trail
 Lau Shui Heung Country Trail
 Wu Kau Tang Country Trail
 Nam Chung Country Trail
 Plover Cove Reservoir Country Trail
 High Junk Peak Country Trail
 Lung Ha Wan Country Trail (C32XX distance posts)
 Ma On Shan Country Trail
 Lung Mun Country Trail
 Yuen Tsuen Ancient Trail
 Yuen Tun Country Trail
 Tai Lam Chung Country Trail
 Kap Lung Ancient Trail
 Sheung Yiu Country Trail
 Pak Tam Country Trail
 Cheung Sheung Country Trail
 Tai Tan Country Trail
 Tai Tong Tree Walk
 Tai Tan Tree Walk
 Pak Tam Chung Tree Walk
 Kei Ling Ha Tree Walk
 Nai Chung Tree Walk
 Kam Shan Tree Walk
 Chung Pui Tree Walk
 Clear Water Bay Tree Walk
 Wong Shek Tree Walk
 Tuen Mun Fitness Trail
 Shing Mun Jogging Trail
 Kowloon Reception Reservoir Jogging Trail
 Shek Lei Pui Reservoir Jogging Trail
 Wan Tsai Orienteering Trail
 Ngau Liu Orienteering Trail
 Chuen Lung Family Walk
 Fung Hang Family Walk
 Ho Pui Reservoir Family Walk
 Hok Tau Reservoir Family Walk
 Kam Shan Family Walk
 Ma On Shan Family Walk
 Pak Tam Chung Family Walk
 Sheung Yiu Family Walk
 Tai Mei Tuk Family Walk
 Tai Mo Shan Family Walk
 Wong Shek Family Walk
 Bride's Pool Nature Trail
 Eagle's Nest Nature Trail
 Hung Mui Kuk Nature Trail
 Lai Chi Wo Nature Trail
 Ma Shi Chau Nature Trail
 Pak Tam Chung Nature Trail
 Pat Sin Leng Nature Trail
 Pineapple Nature Trail
 Rotary Park Nature Trail
 Tai Tong Nature Trail
 Tai Lam Nature Trail
 Tai Po Kau Nature Trail
 Tsiu Hang Nature Trail
 Twisk Nature Trail
 Wan Tsai Natural Trail
 Lung Yeuk Tau Heritage Trail
 Ping Shan Heritage Trail
 Shing Mun War Relics Trail

See also 

 Heritage Trails in Hong Kong
 Dragon's Back
 Tsing Yi Nature Trail
 Tung O Ancient Trail
 Country parks and special areas of Hong Kong

References

External links 

 Agriculture, Fisheries and Conservation Department
 Hong Kong Hiking Web Site
 Hong Kong Countryside Maps

 
Hiking trails
Hong Kong